Qaleh Kabi (also Romanized as Qal‘eh Ka‘bī and Qal‘eh Kabī) is a village in Sardasht Rural District, Zeydun District, Behbahan County, Khuzestan Province, Iran. At the 2006 census, its population was 1,124, in 226 families.

References 

Populated places in Behbahan County